Zhengdong New Area is a new area of Zhengzhou, Henan province, People's Republic of China. Zhengdong New Area was considered by foreign media to be a ghost city throughout its early years, but its rapid growth in population and commercial occupants throughout the 2010s has led to outlets to no longer consider it a ghost city. As of 2015, the new area's population totals 1,150,000, according to its government.

History 
In 2001, the city government commissioned Japanese architect Kisho Kurokawa to draw up a comprehensive urban plan for Zhengdong. Zhengdong New Area consists of the core CBD area, core living area, Longhu area, and Longzihu (Longzi Lake) college district.

Initial struggles 

By 2010, Zhengdong New Area's population totaled approximately 300,000, according to its government, which projected an increase to 800,000 by 2015. In 2010, Zhengdong's gross domestic product totaled 7.48 billion renminbi.

Throughout the early 2010s, Zhengdong was covered by foreign media outlets. A piece by the Daily Mail in 2010 claimed that Zhengdong was China's largest ghost city, a March 2013 piece by 60 Minutes found "vacant subdivisions uninhabited for miles and miles and miles," and Business Insider found Zhengdong's central business district largely vacant later in 2013.

Rapid growth 
However, in the following years, Zhengdong New Area experienced substantial growth. Throughout the mid-2010s, several regional headquarters of banks moved in and the area has begun to fill up with residents. In September 2012, the Zhengzhou East railway station opened in the new area, linking it to China's high speed rail network. In 2013, Zhengdong was also connected to Line 1 of the Zhengzhou Metro. Two more lines connecting Zhengdong with the center of Zhengzhou are under construction. 

In 2015, Zhengdong's government reported the new area's population to be 1,150,000, far above the 800,000 total projected in 2010. They also reported that Zhengdong's gross domestic product ballooned to 26.2 billion renminbi, more than double their 2010 projection of 10.4 renminbi, and experienced an annual increase in gross domestic product of 25%. 

Tales of Zhengdong's rapid growth were corroborated by a number of major media outlets. In May 2015, the South China Morning Post reported that about 150 financial institutions moved into the new area, such as HSBC, People's Bank of China, Bank of China, and Agricultural Bank of China. The publication declared that "Zhengdong is not a ghost city anymore". 

In a 2021 article praising Zhengdong as "an example of how well things can go for a ghost city," Bloomberg News suggests that "favorable government policies for businesses" attracted many large industries to Zhengdong, prompting the new area's growth.

Geography 
Zhengdong New Area spans from Zhongzhou Avenue to its west, to Wansan Highway to its east. To its north is the southern banks of the Yellow River, and to its south is the Longhai railway.

Office Buildings
Zhengdong New Area is home to some highest skyscrapers in Zhengzhou, including the following:
Zhengzhou Greenland Plaza
Zhengzhou Greenland Central Plaza

References

External links

Zhengzhou
New areas (China)